Kaamatan or Pesta Kaamatan is a form of harvest festival celebrated on 30 and 31 of May annually in the state of Sabah and Federal Territory of Labuan in Malaysia. It is normally celebrated by the ethnic Kadazan-Dusuns, as well as by other related ethnic groups in the state, and lasts for the whole of the month of May, ending with a public holiday on a date selected by a priestess known as the bobohizan. 

A beauty pageant known as Unduk Ngadau will be held and it ends the harvest festival with a newly crowned Unduk Ngadau in the annual host district, Penampang. The Harvest Festival comes under the ambit of what is known as Momolianism, the belief system and life philosophy of the Kadazan-Dusun. There is also a dance performance called the Sumazau, a singing contest called Sugandoi, a bodybuilding competition, and other arts and crafts performances. Competitions such as hitting the gong and folk sports have also become one of the main events in this festival.

Popular drinks during the festival are tapai and Kinomol, which is a traditional alak drink. Tapai is drunk from a small bamboo vessel known as a sumbiling or from special glasses called singgarung, likewise made from bamboo.

See also 
 List of harvest festivals
 Kadazandusun Cultural Association
 Kadazan-Dusun

References

External links 
 The Rituals of Tadau Kaamatan
 Introduction to the Kaamatan Festival

Malaysian culture
Sabah
Festivals in Malaysia
Harvest festivals
Public holidays in Malaysia